Gonçalo Teixeira is a masculine Portuguese name. It may refer to:

 Gonçalo Teixeira Correa (died 1632), Portuguese artillerist who instructed Ming Chinese armies
 Gonçalo Teixeira (model), Portuguese model